Hugh William Segar (31 January 1868 – 18 September 1954) was a notable New Zealand mathematician and university professor. He was born in Liverpool, Lancashire, England in 1868.  He was educated at Liverpool College and Trinity College, Cambridge, where he was 2nd Wrangler and a Yeats Prizeman.  He was Professor of Mathematics at University College, Auckland.

References

1868 births
1954 deaths
New Zealand mathematicians
Academic staff of the University of Auckland
English emigrants to New Zealand
Academics from Liverpool
Presidents of the Royal Society of New Zealand
People educated at Liverpool College
Alumni of Trinity College, Cambridge